FIN Atlantic International Film Festival (known as The Atlantic International Film Festival until 2017) is a major international film festival held annually in Halifax, Nova Scotia, Canada since 1980. FIN is the largest Canadian film festival east of Montreal, regularly premiering the region's top films of the year, while bringing the best films of the fall festival circuit to Atlantic Canada.

Events
FIN holds multiple events throughout the year. FIN: Atlantic International Film Festival is an 8-day event, screening films from Canada and around the world, and showcasing Atlantic Canadian films and artists. During the first three days of the Festival, FIN simultaneously runs FIN Partners, an international co-production and co-financing market focusing on narrative feature film and series, which brings together producers and industry decision-makers from Canada and around the world. In the spring, FIN holds FIN Kids (formerly Viewfinders: Atlantic Film Festival for Youth), a touring event designed to engage, entertain, and educate young people.  FIN Outdoor, (formerly Outdoor Film Experience) is FIN's outdoor summer film series held in various locations across the Halifax Regional Municipality.

Attendance
The 2005 festival experienced a 24 per cent attendance increase from the previous year with 29,400 in overall attendance, including 28 sold-out screenings and events. In 2007 attendance was up 18 per cent over 2006, with a record-setting 33,500 people taking part in the 27th annual event.

Awards, Premieres, and Gala Screenings

2021
The opening night film Wildhood won several awards including Best Atlantic Feature and Best Director. The "Reel East Coast Shorts" Gala program held the premiere of Nalujuk Night, which won the Canadian Screen Award for Best Short Documentary at the 10th Canadian Screen Awards in 2022.

2020
Taylor Olson's feature film directorial debut Bone Cage won Best Atlantic Feature & Cinematography for Kevin Fraser. Olson won Best Director and Screenwriting, and his short film "Inceldom, or Why Are the Angry Men Angry" won Best Atlantic Short.

2019
Murmur by Heather Young won Best Atlantic Feature, Director, Screenplay & Cinematography. The film had its premiere at the 2019 Toronto International Film Festival, where it was announced as the winner of the FIPRESCI Discovery Prize. It went on to win the Grand Jury prize at the Slamdance Film Festival, and the John Dunning Best First Feature Award at the 8th Canadian Screen Awards in 2020.

2018
An Audience of Chairs won Best Atlantic Feature, as well as Best Director (Deanne Foley). "Duck Duck Goose" by Shelley Thompson was awarded Best Short and "Grace" by Taylor Olson was the runner up. Shelley Thompson won Best Actress for Splinters and Taylor Olson awarded Best Actor for Hopeless Romantic.

2017
Black Cop won Best Atlantic Feature and Best Director (Cory Bowles).

2016
Maudie was awarded Best Atlantic Feature, the Audience Award was won by Moonlight, and Ashley McKenzie won Best Director for Werewolf. This year's other selections included Weirdos, Theatre Of Life, It's Only the End of the World, Manchester by the Sea, Paterson,  Toni Erdmann,  The Salesman,  Perfume War, and Exit Thread.

2015
Across the Line (Titled Undone at the time of the festival) was awarded Best Atlantic Feature.

2014
Cast No Shadow was awarded Best Atlantic Feature and Best Director (Christian Sparkes) with Percy Hynes White winning the David Renton Award for Outstanding Performance by an actor.

2013
There Are Monsters was awarded Best Atlantic Feature and Best Director (Jay Dahl).

2012
Blackbird was awarded Best Atlantic Feature and Best Director (Jason Buxton). This year's festival also featured the premieres of Roaming, the first film produced through Telefilm Canada's First Feature Program, The Disappeared, and Paul-Émile d'Entremont's documentary Last Chance.

2011
Charlie Zone won Best Atlantic Feature and Best Director (Michael Melski) and Thom Fitzgerald's Cloudburst won the People's Choice Audience Award. A number of high-profile actors, including Brenda Fricker, Billy Boyd, Adam Sinclair, Kristin Kreuk and Famke Janssen, were in attendance. The opening film was Rollertown, the closing film was Mike Clattenburg's Afghan Luke, and the CBC Shorts Gala featured short films by Cory Bowles and Christian Sparkes.

2010
Films that were screened included Bruce McDonald's Trigger, Evan Kelly's debut feature The Corridor, and Paul Andrew Kimball's debut feature Eternal Kiss.

2009
The opening film was Trailer Park Boys: Countdown to Liquor Day.

2008
Down to the Dirt won Best Atlantic Feature and Jason Eisener received the award for Best Editing for his short film Treevenge.

2007
The opening film was Shake Hands With The Devil and The Bodybuilder and I was named best Canadian documentary.

2006
The opening film was The Journals of Knud Rasmussen, directed by Zacharias Kunuk, and the closing film was Susanne Bier's After the Wedding.

2005
The opening film was 3 Needles, directed by Thom Fitzgerald, and Jason Eisener's short The Teeth Beneath premiered.

2004
The opening film was Wilby Wonderful, directed by Daniel MacIvor.

2003
The opening film was The Event, directed by Thom Fitzgerald.

FIN Partners
FIN Partners (formerly known as "Strategic Partners") is an annual international film co-production market, held in Halifax, Nova Scotia, Canada. The event has been held annually since its inception in 1998, and is held simultaneously with the first three days of the Atlantic Film Festival. The 25th edition of the event will take place in September 2022.

Every year, the FIN Partners organizers accept a robust and curated roster of delegates from around the world, in a bid to provide a 'one-stop shop' for film and TV producers and early-stage projects. Similar in format to International Film Festival Rotterdam's Cinemart, the European Film Market's co-production forum, and Independent Film Week's No Borders, FIN Partners is Canada's premiere film and television co-production event. While the event attracts a strong core attendance from Canada, the US and the UK, it also focuses on an annual group of spotlight countries.

Spotlight countries

2020/2021: Benelux, Germany, and the United States
2018/2019: United Kingdom, the Republic of Ireland, and the United States
2016/2017: Nordic countries and the United States
2014/2015: Latin America and the United States
2013: India and United Kingdom
2012: United States and the United Kingdom
2011: South Africa, United States and Australia
2009: Germany and Ireland
2008: Argentina, Brazil and Mexico
2007: France
2006: Australia, New Zealand and South Africa
2005: Germany
2004: Ireland

References

External links
FIN: Atlantic International Film Festival Official Website

Film festivals in Nova Scotia
Festivals in Halifax, Nova Scotia
Film festivals established in 1980
1980 establishments in Nova Scotia